Patrick Janssens (born 19 September 1956) is a Belgian former politician. He was a member of the SP.a and the former mayor of the port city Antwerp.

Career 
Janssens studied "Political and Social Sciences" and "Applied Economic Sciences" (both Masters) at the University of Antwerp and Statistics at the London School of Economics. From 1979 to 1985 he was an assistant in the Department of Sociology and Social Policy at the University of Antwerp, first of Jan Vranken (with whom he wrote the first National Report on Poverty in Belgium, within the framework of the First European Anti-Poverty Programme) and then of Herman Deleeck.

From 1985 to 1989, he ran a market research agency after which he undertook several positions at the marketing agency VVL/BBDO until 1999.

In 1999, he was appointed president of the Socialist Party. He resigned as president to become mayor of Antwerp in 2003. In the general election held the same year, Janssens was elected to the Belgian Chamber of People's Representatives but he left the Chamber one year later when  the 2004 regional elections saw Janssens becoming a member of the Flemish Parliament. In the municipal elections of 2006, he was overwhelmingly elected for another term as mayor.

He was longlisted for the 2008 World Mayor award.

Janssens lost the 2012 municipal elections to Bart De Wever of the N-VA.

References

External links

 
 citymayors.com profile

1956 births
Living people
Alumni of the London School of Economics
Mayors of Antwerp, Belgium
Socialistische Partij Anders politicians
Belgian socialists
University of Antwerp alumni
21st-century Belgian politicians